José García Ladrón de Guevara (5 December 1929 – 3 March 2019) was a Spanish poet, journalist, and Senator.

References

1929 births 
2019 deaths
Spanish Socialist Workers' Party politicians
Members of the Senate of Spain
20th-century Spanish poets
21st-century Spanish poets
20th-century Spanish politicians
20th-century Spanish male writers
21st-century Spanish politicians
People from Granada